Léon Despontin (6 July 1888 – 7 August 1972) was a Belgian racing cyclist. He rode in the 1921 Tour de France. He placed seventh in the race with 200 points.

References

1888 births
1972 deaths
Belgian male cyclists
Place of birth missing